The 2021 UMB World Three-cushion Championship was the 73rd edition of the tournament. It took place from 7 to 11 December 2021 in Sharm el-Sheikh, Egypt.

Bracket

References

External links
Results

UMB World Three-cushion Championship
UMB
UMB
International sports competitions hosted by Egypt
UMB